This is a list of notable encyclopedias sorted by branch of knowledge. For the purposes of this list, an encyclopedia is defined as a "compendium that contains information on either all branches of knowledge or a particular branch of knowledge." For other sorting standards, see List of encyclopedias.

General knowledge

Catalan 
 Gran Enciclopèdia Catalana – Catalan-language encyclopedia, started in fascicles, and published in 1968 by

Chinese
 Encyclopedia of China
 Gujin tushu jicheng – Chinese language encyclopedia completed in 1725 (10 million Chinese characters)
 Yongle Encyclopedia – once contained 11,095 volumes and around 370 million Chinese characters but now contains less than 400 volumes

Czech
Riegrův slovník naučný – first Czech encyclopedia published in 1860–1874 with 11 volumes, supplement vol. in 1890, online)
 Otto's encyclopedia – largest Czech-language encyclopedia published between 1888 and 1908 (28 vols) and 1930–43 (12 vols, incomplete). Volumes 1–28 online
Příruční slovník naučný – first post-war encyclopedia. With strong communist ideology. Four volumes, 1962–1967.
Malá československá encklopedie – Small Czechoslovak encyclopedia, it was supposed to be forerunner to Great Czechoslovak encyclopedia that was never published, 6 volumes, 1984–1987.
Diderot (8 volumes, 1999–2000)
Universum (10 volumes, 1999–2001)
Czech Wikipedia (2002–)

Danish
 Den Store Danske Encyklopædi

Dutch 

 Winkler Prins – published in print between 1870 and 1993 and made available digitally to the present day
 Oosthoek – published between 1907 and 1981
 Christelijke Encyclopedie – published between 1926 and 2005
 Eerste Nederlandse Systematisch Ingerichte Encyclopaedie –  published between 1946 and 1952
 Standaard Encyclopedie – published between 1969 and 1974 by Standaard Uitgeverij Antwerpen
 Grote Nederlandse Larousse Encyclopedie – published between 1971 and 1979
 Grote Spectrum Encyclopedie – published between 1974 and 1980

English
 Academic American Encyclopedia – 21-volume work published in 1980, also issued by Grolier under the names Barnes & Noble New American Encyclopedia, Global International Encyclopedia, Grolier Academic Encyclopedia, Grolier International Encyclopedia, Lexicon Universal Encyclopedia, and Macmillan Family Encyclopedia
 Chambers's Encyclopaedia – published in 1859 by W. Chambers and R. Chambers
 The Children's Encyclopedia – by Arthur Mee, published 1908–64 in the UK and in the US starting in 1910 as Grolier's The Book of Knowledge
 Children's Illustrated Encyclopedia – published by Dorling Kindersley
 Collier's Encyclopedia
 Columbia Encyclopedia – one-volume encyclopedia from Columbia University Press last published in 2000
 The Complete Compendium of Universal Knowledge (1891)
 Compton's Encyclopedia – 26-volume encyclopedia
 Compton's Interactive Encyclopedia
 Cyclopædia, or an Universal Dictionary of Arts and Sciences – 1728 publication by Ephraim Chambers
 Dobson's Encyclopædia – first encyclopedia printed in the United States, but mostly a reprint of the Encyclopædia Britannica Third Edition
 Edinburgh Encyclopædia – 18 volumes printed and published by William Blackwood and edited by David Brewster between 1808 and 1830
 Encyclopædia Britannica – one of the best-known encyclopedias in English, online-only since 2010
 Encyclopædia Britannica Ultimate Reference Suite – DVD version of Encyclopædia Britannica
 Encyclopædia Metropolitana – 39 volumes in 59 parts published between 1817 and 1845
 Encyclopedia Americana – both a print work and currently a part of Grolier Multimedia Encyclopedia
 English Cyclopaedia – 23 volumes, published 1854–1862
 English Encyclopaedia – 10 volumes, published in 1802
 Everybody's Enquire Within – illustrated book of miscellaneous knowledge issued in weekly instalments from 1937 to 1938
 Everyman's Encyclopaedia – published by Joseph Dent from 1913 as part of the Everyman's Library
 Everything2 – collaborative Web-based database of interlinked user-submitted articles
 Funk & Wagnalls Standard Encyclopedia – first published in 1912; changed its name to Funk & Wagnalls New Standard Encyclopedia in 1931
 Grolier Multimedia Encyclopedia – electronic encyclopedia published by Grolier
 Groliers Encyclopedia
 Harmsworth's Universal Encyclopaedia – edited by John Alexander Hammerton and published 1921–22
 Hutchinson Encyclopedia – single-volume work first published in 1948
 New American Cyclopedia – 16 volumes published between 1857 and 1866
 Nupedia – peer reviewed, open content online encyclopedia project, currently inactive
 Open Site – effort inspired by, but not officially affiliated with, the Open Directory Project
 Oracle Encyclopædia – five-volume encyclopedia published in 1895
 An Outline of Modern Knowledge – published in 1931 by Victor Gollancz
 Pears Cyclopaedia – one-volume encyclopaedia published annually in the United Kingdom
 Probert Encyclopaedia – online topical encyclopedia consisting of almost 100,000 short entries, published by Mathew Probert and based in the United Kingdom
 World Book Encyclopedia – designed for family use; the world's best selling print encyclopedia

French 
 Découvertes Gallimard – illustrated encyclopaedia in pocket format, 588 volumes plus 150⁺ volumes of spin-offs, published 1986–present
 Encyclopédie, ou dictionnaire raisonné des sciences, des arts et des métiers – contributed by the Encyclopédistes, edited by Denis Diderot and Jean le Rond d'Alembert, published 1751–1772

German
 Allgemeine Encyclopädie der Wissenschaften und Künste – very large 19th-century encyclopaedia by Ersch and Gruber
 Brockhaus Enzyklopädie – best-known encyclopedia in German, online-only since 2014
 Grosses vollständiges Universal-Lexicon – huge 18th-century encyclopedia by Johann Heinrich Zedler
 Meyers Konversations-Lexikon

Italian
 Treccani – also known as Enciclopedia Italiana di Scienze, Lettere ed Arti

Latin
 Lexicon Universale – published in 1698

Persian
 The Book of Healing – 30-volume Persian-language encyclopedia published by Avicenna in 1027 ( Kitāb al-Šifāʾ, Latin: Sufficientia)
 The Persian Encyclopedia – three-volume encyclopedia edited by Gholamhossein Mosahab, partially based on the early editions of the Columbia Encyclopedia

Polish
 Nowe Ateny – published in 1745–1746
 Universal Encyclopedia – 1859, 28 volumes, Orgelbrand
 Wielka Encyklopedia Powszechna PWN – 1962–1970, 13 volumes, PWN
 Wielka Encyklopedia PWN – 2001–2005, 31 volumes, PWN

Russian
 Brockhaus and Efron – imperial encyclopedia in 86 volumes
 Great Soviet Encyclopedia (Большая Советская Энциклопедия) – second largest and most comprehensive encyclopedia in Russian; there were three editions; the third edition of 1969–78 contains 30 volumes
 Great Russian Encyclopedia – universal Russian encyclopedia, completed in 36 volumes (2004-2017)

Slovak
Slovenský náučný slovník. 3 volumes 1932. First general encyclopedia in Slovak language. 
Pyramída. Published between 1971 and 1990 in journal form (224 issues).
Malá slovenská encyklopédia. 1 volume 1993
Encyclopaedia Beliana. 20 planned volumes, 1999–, 9 volumes published as of 2021
Všeobecný encyklopedický slovník. 2002, four volumes
Slovak Wikipedia. 2003–
Univerzum – všeobecná obrazová encyklopédia A - Ž. 1 volume, 2011

Slovenian
 Enciklopedija Slovenije

Spanish
 Enciclopedia Libre Universal (also known as Enciclopedia Libre) – project to create a Spanish encyclopedia using wiki software, released under the GFDL
 Enciclopedia universal ilustrada europeo-americana – largest encyclopedia of its time; also known as Enciclopedia Espasa o Enciclopedia Espasa-Calpe

Swedish
 Nationalencyklopedin – encyclopedia in Swedish
 Susning.nu – project to create a Swedish-language encyclopedia using wiki software; an anyone-can-edit encyclopedia until 2004; shut down in 2009

Turkish
 Anabritannica – published in Turkey and based on the Britannica Micropædia

Ukrainian
 Ukrainian Soviet Encyclopedia (Українська радянська енциклопедія) – encyclopedia in Ukrainian; its first edition was 17 volumes

Multiple languages
 Microsoft Encarta – computer-based encyclopedia published by Microsoft, now discontinued
 Wikipedia – world's largest free encyclopedia; a project to create a comprehensive encyclopedia using wiki software

Specialized encyclopedias

National, regional, ethnic or cultural

Australia
 Australian Encyclopaedia (1925, 1958, 1977, 1983, 1988, 1996)

Austria
 aeiou Encyclopedia (1996ff.)

Bangladesh
 Banglapedia – 10 volumes published in 2003; bilingual; English and Bengali

Canada
 The Canadian Encyclopedia (1985 and 1988)

Croatia
 Hrvatska opća enciklopedija (started in 1999 – 7th vol. 2005 of 11)

Ethiopia
 Encyclopaedia Aethiopica – basic reference work for Ethiopian and Eritrean studies

Germany
 Deutsche Biographie (Biographical dictionary of Germans)

Iceland 
 Icelandic Encyclopedia A-Ö

Iran
 Encyclopædia Iranica – on Iranian peoples and Persia
 Encyclopaedia Islamica
 Encyclopaedia of Imam Ali
 The Encyclopedia of Iranian Old Music – published in Tehran, 2000
 Encyclopaedia of Persian Language and Literature – published by the Academy of Persian Language and Literature in Persian in Tehran
 Encyclopaedia of Shia

Italy
 Dizionario Biografico degli Italiani (Biographical dictionary of Italians) – Istituto dell'Enciclopedia Italiana

Malaysia
 The Encyclopedia of Malaysia – published from 1998 to 2007

Morocco
 Maelimat al-maghrib – published between 1989 and 2006 totaling 27 volumes.

New Zealand
 The Cyclopedia of New Zealand (1897–08) – unofficial; most subjects paid to have their articles appear; online at the New Zealand Electronic Text Centre
 An Encyclopaedia of New Zealand (1966–) – official
 Te Ara: The Encyclopedia of New Zealand (2005–) – official, incorporating the full text of An Encyclopaedia of New Zealand

Poland
 Encyklopedia Polski (Encyclopedia of Poland) – 2005, 10 volumes

Slovakia
Encyklopédia Slovenska. (Encyclopedia of Slovakia) 6 volumes, 1977–1982.

Slovenia
 Enciklopedija Slovenije – published in 1987–2002

Sweden
 Nordisk familjebok – encyclopedia in Swedish

Ukraine
 Encyclopedia of Ukraine – English five-volume version of the Encyclopedia of Ukrainian Studies
 Internet Encyclopedia of Ukraine – online version of the Encyclopedia of Ukraine 
 Encyclopedia of Modern Ukraine – multi-volume comprehensive encyclopedia about Ukraine from the 20th and 21st centuries

United Kingdom
 The London Encyclopaedia – 1007-page reference of the city of London; pub. 1983

United States

 Encyclopedia of Chicago
 Encyclopedia of New Jersey
 The Encyclopedia of New York City
 Handbook of Texas

Yugoslavia
 Enciklopedija Jugoslavije
 Opća enciklopedija JLZ (1977–82)

Field

Art and architecture
 Encyclopedia of Vernacular Architecture of the World – in 3 volumes (1997)
 Grove Dictionary of Art – in 34 volumes (1996)

Entertainment
 Allgame – comprehensive online guide to computer and video games created by All Media Guide
 Allmovie – comprehensive online guide to movies created by All Media Guide
 Allmusic – comprehensive online guide to music created by All Media Guide
 The Aurum Film Encyclopedia
 The Motion Picture Guide

Environmental science
 Encyclopedia of Earth (EoE) – electronic reference about the Earth, its natural environments, and their interaction with society
 Encyclopedia of Life Support Systems (EOLSS) – sponsored by UNESCO—an interdisciplinary encyclopedia, inspired by the sustainable development movement

Fashion and dress
 Berg Encyclopedia of World Dress and Fashion – edited by Joanne B. Eicher, 10 volumes

Fiction
 The Rocklopedia Fakebandica – by T. Mike Childs, published in 2004
 The Star Trek Encyclopedia
 TV Tropes

History and biography
 African American National Biography
 Africana – The Encyclopedia of the African and African-American Experience
 American National Biography
 Appleton's Cyclopedia of American Biography – 19th-century American encyclopedia
 Conspiracy Encyclopedia
 An Encyclopedia of World History – single-volume work; First Edition, 1940; Sixth Edition, 2001
 Encyklopedia Polski
 Harper's Encyclopedia of United States History
 Lexikon des Mittelalters – German encyclopedia of medieval history, published in 1980
 Oxford Classical Dictionary – despite the name, a one-volume encyclopedia for antiquity

Law
 American Jurisprudence
 Corpus Juris Secundum
 Halsbury's Laws of Australia
 Halsbury's Laws of England
 Stair Memorial Encyclopaedia
 Encyclopedia of Law

International and comparative law
 Max Planck Encyclopedia of Public International Law

Literature
 Benet's Reader's Encyclopedia
 Benet's Reader's Encyclopedia of American Literature
 The Cambridge History of English and American Literature
 The Encyclopedia of Science Fiction – first published in 1979 by John Clute and Peter Nicholls
 Encyclopaedia of Indian Literature
 Literary Encyclopedia (Литературная энциклопедия) – 11 volumes, 1929–39 (incomplete; 12th volume draft later published)
 The Literary Encyclopedia – online encyclopedia started in 2000
 The Penguin Encyclopedia of Horror and the Supernatural – published in 1986; edited by Jack Sullivan
 The Poets' Encyclopedia – edited by Michael Andre
 Soviet Concise Literary Encyclopedia – Soviet-era encyclopedia of literature; 9 volumes published between 1962 and 1978
 Cyrillo-Methodian Encyclopedia of the Institute of Literature at the Bulgarian Academy of Sciences from 1985 to 2003.

Mathematics
 CRC Concise Encyclopedia of Mathematics – second edition 2002, based on Mathworld
 Encyclopaedia of Mathematics – published by Springer Verlag in 2002
 Encyclopedia of Cryptography and Security – published by Springer-Verlag in 2005
 Encyclopedic Dictionary of Mathematics (EDM2) – second edition published in 1993 by The Mathematical Society of Japan
 Klein's encyclopedia – published 1898–1935
 Mathworld – online encyclopedia by Eric Weisstein
 On-Line Encyclopedia of Integer Sequences (OEIS)
 planetmath

Medicine

 Kitab al-Tasrif (The Method of Medicine) – by Abu al-Qasim al-Zahrawi (Abulcasis)
 The Canon of Medicine – by Avicenna
 Encyclopedia of Public Health
 Medical Compendium in Seven Books – by Paul of Aegina in the 7th century CE; it was the most complete medical encyclopedia in its day
 Taber's Cyclopedic Medical Dictionary

Music
 Eerste Nederlandse Pop Encyclopedie
 Encyclopedia of Popular Music
 The Grove Dictionary of Music and Musicians
 International Encyclopedia of Women Composers
 Musik in Geschichte und Gegenwart
 The New Grove Dictionary of Opera

Nautical
 List of nautical dictionaries

Philosophy
 Encyclopedia of Philosophy – edited by Paul Edwards
 Routledge Encyclopedia of Philosophy
Stanford Encyclopedia of Philosophy – online encyclopedia

Religion

Christianity
 The Catholic Encyclopedia – 1907–12 (15 vls.)
 Encyclopædia Biblica
 Encyclopedia of Christianity – John Stephen Bowden, ed., 1 vol., Oxford UP, 2006
 Encyclopedia of Mormonism
 Lexikon für Theologie und Kirche – 1930–38 (10 vls.)
 New Catholic encyclopedia – 1967–96 (15 vls. and 4 supplementary vls.); 2. ed. 2003 (15 vls.)
 Theologische Realenzyklopädie (TRE) – Hrsg. Gerhard Müller. 38 vls.; Berlin 1977–2007
 Twentieth Century Encyclopedia of Catholicism – Hawthorn Books. 150 vls.; New York City 1958–1971

Islam
 Encyclopaedia Islamica
 Encyclopaedia of Imam Ali
 Encyclopaedia of Islam
 Encyclopaedia of Shia
 The Hussaini Encyclopedia
 Urdu Encyclopaedia of Islam
 Islami Bishwakosh

Judaism
 Encyclopaedia Judaica – published 1972–91, second edition 2006
 Jewish Encyclopedia – published 1901–06; original full 12 volumes
 Shorter Jewish Encyclopedia in Russian – 11 volumes, published 1976–2005 in Jerusalem
 Talmudic Encyclopedia
 The YIVO Encyclopedia of Jews in Eastern Europe – Yale University Press, 2008

Hinduism
 Encyclopedia of Hinduism – published 2012

Science
 Encyclopedia Astronautica – reference website maintained by space-travel enthusiast Mark Wade
 Encyclopedia of Analytical Chemistry – Wiley, 2000, 15 volumes
 Encyclopedia of Flora and Fauna of Bangladesh
 Encyclopedia of Genetics
 Encyclopedia of Life Sciences (ELS) – owned by John Wiley & Sons; has both a 20-volume print edition and an online edition
 The Illustrated Science and Invention Encyclopedia
 McGraw-Hill Encyclopedia of Science and Technology – also comes in a one-volume edition
 The New Encyclopedia of Snakes

Engineering

Chemical Engineering

 Ullmann's Encyclopedia of Industrial Chemistry – currently in its 7th edition; first edition in German available in the public domain.

Social sciences
 International Encyclopedia of the Social & Behavioral Sciences – edited by Neil Smelser and Paul Baltes, 26 vls., Elsevier, 2001
 International Encyclopedia of the Social Sciences – edited by David L. Sills, New York, New York (etc.); Macmillan, 1968
 International Encyclopedia of the Social Sciences – edited by William A. Darity, Jr., Detroit (etc.); Macmillan Reference USA, 2008

Economics
 The New Palgrave Dictionary of Economics – 2nd Edition (2008)

Sports
 The Baseball Encyclopedia
 Total Baseball, The Ultimate Baseball Encyclopedia – 2004, by John Thorn et al.
 World Sports Encyclopedia – 2003, Atena/MBI

Other
 Atlas of the Prehistoric World
 Above and Beyond: The Encyclopedia of Aviation and Space Sciences
 Christie's World Encyclopedia of Champagne & Sparkling Wine
 Encyclopedia of Cybernetics
 Encyclopedia of Marxism – online encyclopedia released under the GNU Free Documentation License, part of the Marxist Internet Archive.
 The Grocer's Encyclopedia
 Illustrated Encyclopedia of Aircraft
 Larousse Gastronomique – encyclopedia of food and cooking
 A Military Encyclopedia
 Mining Encyclopedia
 MusicBrainz – project to create a free music encyclopedia, released under the Open Content License; the first goal is to create a database similar to CDDB
 The Oxford Companion to Wine
 Perelman's Pocket Cyclopedia of Cigars – encyclopedia and history of (Non-Cuban) cigars and their manufacturers (also Perelman's Pocket Cyclopaedia of Havana Cigars)
 The Sotheby's Wine Encyclopedia

See also 
 List of encyclopedias by language (English)
 List of historical encyclopedias
 List of online encyclopedias
 Lists of encyclopedias

References

 
Lists of reference books